Groovin' High is an album by pianist Hank Jones recorded in 1978 for the Muse label.

Reception

AllMusic awarded the album 4½ stars stating "This is essentially a Bebop jam session, but due to the participation of cornetist/arranger Thad Jones, the music has its surprises".

Track listing
 "Algo Bueno" (Dizzy Gillespie) – 3:49
 "Anthropology" (Charlie Parker, Gillespie) – 5:35
 "Sippin' at Bells" (Miles Davis) – 4:44
 "Blue Monk" (Thelonious Monk) – 2:35
 "Groovin' High" (Gillespie) – 5:25
 "I Mean You" (Monk) – 5:52
 "Jackie-ing" (Monk) – 4:42

Personnel 
Hank Jones – piano
Thad Jones – cornet
Charlie Rouse – tenor saxophone
Sam Jones – bass
Mickey Roker – drums

References 

1978 albums
Hank Jones albums
Muse Records albums
Albums recorded at Van Gelder Studio